Bolton is a town in Worcester County, Massachusetts, United States. Bolton is in eastern Massachusetts, located 25 miles west-northwest of downtown Boston. The population was 5,665 at the 2020 census.

History

The town of Bolton was incorporated on June 24, 1738, following an influx of settlers. Town historian Esther Whitcomb, descendant of one of Bolton's earliest documented settlers, cites the recorded birth of a son, Hezekiah, to Josiah Whitcomb in 1681. By 1711, according to Whitcomb, more than 150 people were living on Bolton soil, despite a local history of Indian uprisings and one massacre. Many early houses were protected by flankers, and were designated as garrisons. Bolton's history is interesting because it is reflective of early settlement patterns in the central Massachusetts area, and the conflicts with King Philip (Metacom) and his Indian soldiers. The town was formerly part of the town of Lancaster, but seceded along the Still River, where the current boundary line still stands.

In the 1920s Bolton was used as a setting and mentioned a number of times in H.P. Lovecraft's fiction: as a setting in his Herbert West—Reanimator, and also mentioned in his The Rats in the Walls and The Colour out of Space. However, H.P. Lovecraft's Bolton was located on the North Shore near Ipswich, Massachusetts, and was described as a factory town bearing little resemblance to the actual town.

Geography

Surrounding towns
Bolton is located in MetroWest, surrounded by several towns:

Demographics

As of the census of 2010, there were 4,897 people, 1,670 households, and 1,391 families residing in the town. The racial makeup of the town was 94.9% White, 0.5% African American, 0.1% Native American, 2.7% Asian, 0.02% Pacific Islander, 0.2% from other races, and 1.6% from two or more races. Hispanic or Latino of any race were 1.8% of the population.

There were 1,670 households, out of which 43.7% had children under the age of 18 living with them, 74.3% were married couples living together, 2.8% had a male householder with no husband present, 6.2% had a female householder with no husband present, and 16.7% were non-families. The householders of 12.1% of all households were living alone and the householders of 4.9% of households were living alone who was 65 years of age or older. The average household size was 2.93 and the average family size was 3.22.

In the town, the population was spread out, with 31.2% of the population 19 and under, 3.4% from 20 to 24, 19.7% from 25 to 44, 36.3% from 45 to 64, and 9.4% who were 65 years of age or older. The median age was 38 years. For every 100 females, there were 100.8 males. For every 100 females age 18 and over, there were 96.1 males.

As of 2015, the median income for a household in the town was $147,446, and the median income for a family was $155,063. Males had a median income of $101,042 versus $71,905 for females. The per capita income for the town was $51,791. About 1.3% of families and 1.8% of the population were below the poverty line, including 1.6% of those under age 18 and 2.0% of those age 65 or over.

Government

Schools

Bolton is a member of the Nashoba Regional School District, also serving the towns of Lancaster and Stow. Bolton is home to Florence Sawyer School (Pre-K–8) and Nashoba Regional High School.

Notable people

 Suzy Becker (born 1962), is an author, illustrator, entrepreneur, educator, and social activist
 William C. Edes (1856–1922), was a U.S. civil engineer who was the chairman for Alaskan Engineering Commission
 Bill Ezinicki (1924–2012), NHL hockey player, professional golfer, won three Stanley Cups with the Toronto Maple Leafs, inducted into PGA tour hall of fame New England Section in 1997
 Heather K. Gerken (born 1969), is the Dean and Sol & Lillian Goldman Professor of Law at Yale Law School
 Hal Gill (born 1975), former NHL player
 William Ellery Leonard (1876–1944), poet and author, professor at the University of Wisconsin's Dept. of English
 J. Sterling Livingston (1916–2010), was an American entrepreneur, management consultant, and professor at the Harvard Business School
 Frank L. McNamara Jr. (born 1947), is an American attorney who served as the United States Attorney for the District of Massachusetts
 Amos Nourse (1794–1877), United States Senator from Maine
 Karen O'Connor (born 1958), is an American equestrian who competes in three-day eventing
 Philip J. Philbin (1898–1972), member of the United States House of Representatives from Massachusetts's 3rd congressional district from 1943 to 1971
 Wilbert Robinson (1864–1934), Baseball Hall of Fame manager nicknamed "Uncle Robbie", managed the Brooklyn Dodgers for 17 years
 Frederick A. Sawyer (1822–1891), United States Senator from South Carolina
 Samuel Stearns (1741–1809), astronomer and author
 William C. Sullivan (1912–1977), was a Federal Bureau of Investigation official
 Nathan Wilson (1758–1834), was a United States Representative from New York

References

External links

Bolton official website
Bolton Library
Bolton Historical Society
History of Bolton 1738–1938, free online in digital facsimile.

 
Towns in Worcester County, Massachusetts